Stanton High School is a public high school located in the city of Stanton, Texas in Martin County, United States and classified as a 3A school by the UIL. It is a part of the Stanton Independent School District located in southeast Martin County. In 2015, the school was rated "Met Standard" by the Texas Education Agency.

Athletics
The Stanton Buffaloes compete in these sports - 

Basketball
Cross Country
Football
Golf
Powerlifting
Tennis
Track and Field

State Titles
Football - 
1997(2A)
Boys Golf - 
1986(2A)
Boys Powerlifting
2022(3A)
Girls Powerlifting
2022(3A)

Notable alumni
Steve Fryar, professional steer wrestler

References

External links
Stanton ISD website

Public high schools in Texas
Schools in Martin County, Texas